The Lisenser Spitze (3230 m) is a mountain in the Stubai Alps of Austria.

External links
 Information on Lisenser Spitze (in German)

Mountains of Tyrol (state)
Mountains of the Alps